Thailand participated in the 2002 Asian Games held in Busan, South Korea from 29 September to 14 October 2002. Thailand ended the games at 43 overall medals including 14 gold medals.

Medalists

Nations at the 2002 Asian Games
2002
Asian Games